Badmestan kookherd   is a village in Kukherd Rural District, Kukherd District,
Hormozgan Province in the south of Iran.

Badmestan kookherd the small village from Kukherd District in the  city of Bastak (Bastak County شهرستان بستک) Hormozgan Province.

At the 2006 census, its population was (25 ), in ( 4) families.

See also 

Kookherd
Bastak 
Bandar Abbas
Morbagh
Bandar Lengeh
Hormozgān  
Larestan
Lar, Iran
Evaz
Morbagh
Bandar Abbas
Fareghan
Ravidar
Kish Island
AL madani
Maghoh
Chale Kookherd

References

External links 
  Kookherd Website.

Populated places in Bastak County
Kukherd District